As of 2020, the world's "core" Jewish population (those identifying as Jews above all else) was estimated at 15 million, 0.2% of the 8 billion worldwide population. This number rises to 18 million with the addition of the "connected" Jewish population, including those who say they are partly Jewish or that have Jewish backgrounds from at least one Jewish parent, and rises again to 21 million with the addition of the "enlarged" Jewish population, including those who say they have Jewish backgrounds but no Jewish parents and all non-Jewish household members who live with Jews. Counting all those who are eligible for Israeli citizenship under Israel's Law of Return, in addition to Israeli Jews, raised the total to 23.8 million.

Two countries account for 81% of those recognised as Jews or of sufficient Jewish ancestry to be eligible for citizenship in Israel under its Law of Return: the United States with 51% and Israel with 30% (including the West Bank with 2%). An additional 16% is split between France (3%), Canada (3%), Russia (3%), the United Kingdom (2%), Argentina (1%), Germany (1%), Ukraine (1%), Brazil (1%), Australia (1%), and Hungary (1%), while the remaining 3% are spread around approximately 98 other countries and territories with less than 0.5% each. With nearly 6.8 million Jews, Israel is the only Jewish-majority country and the only explicitly Jewish state.

In 1939, the core Jewish population reached its historical peak of 17 million. Due to the Holocaust, this number was reduced to 11 million by 1945. The population grew to around 13 million by the 1970s and then recorded almost no growth until around 2005, due to low fertility rates and assimilation of Jews. From 2005 to 2018, the world's Jewish population grew 0.63% annually on average, while world population overall grew 1.1% annually in the same period. This increase primarily reflected the rapid growth of Haredi and some Orthodox sectors, who remain a growing proportion of Jews.

Trends

Israel
Recent Jewish population dynamics are characterized by continued steady increase in the Israeli Jewish population and flat or declining numbers in other countries (the diaspora). Jewish immigration to Palestine began in earnest following the 1839 Tanzimat reforms; between 1840 and 1880, the Jewish population of Palestine rose from 9,000 to 23,000. In the late 19th century, 99.7% of the world's Jews lived outside the region, with Jews representing 2–5% of the population of the Palestine region. Through the first five phases of Aliyah, the Jewish population rose to 630,000 by the inception of the state of Israel in 1948. By 2014 this had risen to 6,135,000, while the population of the diaspora has dropped from 10.5 to 8.1 million over the same period. Current Israeli Jewish demographics are characterized by a relatively high fertility rate of 3 children per woman and a stable age distribution. The overall growth rate of Jews in Israel is 1.7% annually. The diaspora countries, by contrast, have low Jewish birth rates, an increasingly elderly age composition, and a negative balance of people leaving Judaism versus those joining.
Immigration trends also favour Israel ahead of diaspora countries. The Jewish state has a positive immigration balance (called aliyah in Hebrew). Israel saw its Jewish numbers significantly buoyed by a million-strong wave of Jewish immigrants from the former Soviet Union in the 1990s, and immigration growth has been steady (in the low tens of thousands) since then.

Rest of the world
In the rest of the world, only the United States, Canada, Australia, and Germany have had a positive recent Jewish migration balance outside of Israel. In general, the modern English-speaking world has seen an increase in its share of the diaspora since the Holocaust and the foundation of Israel, while historic diaspora Jewish populations in Eastern Europe, North Africa, and the Middle East have significantly declined or disappeared.
France continues to be home to the world's third largest Jewish community, at around 500,000, but has shown an increasingly negative trend. As a long term tend, intermarriage has reduced its "core" Jewish population and increased its "connected" and "enlarged" Jewish populations. More recently, migration loss to Israel amongst French Jews reached the tens of thousands between 2014 and 2017, following a wave of anti-Semitic attacks.
According to a 2017 Pew Research Center survey, between 2010 and 2015 "an estimated one million babies were born to Jewish mothers and roughly 600,000 Jewish died, meaning that the natural increase in the Jewish population – i.e., the number of births minus the number of deaths – was 500,000 over this period". According to the same study, over the next four decades the number of Jews around the world is expected to increase from 14.2 million in 2015 to 20.3 million in 2060.

Debate over United States numbers
The number of Jews in the United States has been the subject of much debate because of questions over counting methodology. In 2012, Sheskin and Dashefsky put forward a figure of 6.72 million based on a mixture of local surveys, informed local estimates, and US census data. They qualified their estimate with a concern over double counting and suggested the real figure may lie between 6 and 6.4 million. Drawing on their work, the Steinhardt Social Research Institute released their own estimate of 6.8 million Jews in the United States in 2013. These figures are in contrast to Israeli demographer Sergio Della Pergola's number of 5,425,000, also in 2012. He has called high estimates “implausible” and “unreliable” although he revised the United States Jewish number upward to 5.7 million in subsequent years. This controversy followed a similar debate in 2001 when the National Jewish Population Survey released a United States Jewish estimate as low as 5.2 million only to have serious methodological errors suggested in their survey. In sum, a confidence interval of a million or more people is likely to persist in reporting on the number of Jewish Americans.

By country

Below is a list of Jewish populations in the world by country. All data below, except the last column, are from the Berman Jewish DataBank at Stanford University in the World Jewish Population (2020) report coordinated by Sergio DellaPergola at the Hebrew University of Jerusalem. The Jewish DataBank figures are primarily based on national censuses combined with trend analysis.
 Core Jewish population refers to those who consider themselves Jews to the exclusion of all else.
 Connected Jewish population includes the core Jewish population and additionally those who say they are partly Jewish or that have Jewish background from at least one Jewish parent. 
 Enlarged Jewish population includes the Jewish connected population and those who say they have Jewish background but not a Jewish parent, and all non-Jews living in households with Jews. 
 Eligible Jewish population includes all those eligible for immigration to Israel under its Law of Return. 
 National official population is the Jewish population reported by a national source. Note that the "National" results may not be entirely accurate, as other sources may have conflicting accounts of Jewish populations in some countries.

Table

pct = percent of total
pmp = per million people

Remnant and vanished populations
The above table represents Jews that number at least a few dozen per country. Reports exist of Jewish communities remaining in other territories in the low single digits that are on the verge of disappearing, particularly in the Muslim world, as their reaction to the birth of Israel in 1948 was the persecution of Jews in nearly all Muslim lands; these are often of historical interest as they represent the remnant of much larger Jewish populations. For example, Egypt had a Jewish community of 80,000 in the early 20th century that numbered fewer than 40 as of 2014, mainly because of the forced expulsion movements to Israel and other countries at that time. Despite a 2,000 year history of Jewish presence, there are no longer any known Jews living in Afghanistan, as its last Jewish resident Zablon Simintov fled the country in September 2021. In Syria, another ancient Jewish community saw mass exodus at the end of the 20th century and numbered fewer than 20 in the midst of the Syrian Civil War. The size of the Jewish community in Indonesia has been variously given as 65, 100, or 18 at most over the last 50 years. In Yemen due to the ongoing civil war, the Yemenite Jews have faced persecution by the Houthis, who've demanded they convert to Islam or face mandatory expulsion from the country. The Israeli military has conducted operations evacuating the population and moving them to Israel. On 28 March 2021, 13 Jews were forced by the Houthis to leave Yemen, leaving the last four elderly Jews in Yemen. According to one report there are six Jews left in Yemen: one woman; her brother; 3 others, and Levi Salem Marahbi (who had been imprisoned for helping smuggle a Torah scroll out of Yemen).

See also 
 Aliyah
 Historical Jewish population by country
 Historical Jewish population comparisons
 Jewish ethnic divisions
 Judaism
 Judaism by country
 Jewish population by city

References

External links
 Israelbooks.com The Jewish People Policy Planning Institute Annual Assessment 2004–2005: Between Thriving and Decline. Gefen Publishing House.
 Publications on Jewish population at the Berman Jewish Policy Archive @ NYU Wagner
 Jewish Population and Migration, by YIVO Encyclopedia

Jews by country
Lists of countries
Religious demographics